Willow Glenn is a historic home located at Barstow, Calvert County, Maryland, United States. It is an impressive, Georgian structure of grand proportions; constructed entirely of brick in Flemish bond with random glazed headers. The home typifies the kind of dwelling erected by Maryland's wealthiest tobacco planters of the colonial period.

Willow Glenn was listed on the National Register of Historic Places in 1973.

References

External links
, including undated photo, at Maryland Historical Trust

Houses on the National Register of Historic Places in Maryland
Houses in Calvert County, Maryland
Georgian architecture in Maryland
National Register of Historic Places in Calvert County, Maryland